Mavuradona (Mvuradona) is a range of mountains stretching from Mazambique(great dyke)making a valley on the north (Dande 
valley) wilderness area in Northern Zimbabwe. The name is Shona, roughly translating as 'Land of Falling Water' or simply 'water falls'. The area, lying north of Centenary on the Zambezi Escarpment, is relatively unknown. Characterised by rugged mountainous hills and miombo woodland, the wild landscape was a main theatre of conflict during the war. Declared a game reserve in 1988, its protected status has lured wildlife back. Antelope include sable, eland, kudu, waterbuck and impala. Elephant roam the area, baboon, warthog, zebra and leopard are common and lion are occasionally seen. The 290 species of birds include several types of eagles that inhabit the water-berry, mhobohobo, msasa and other brachystegia trees.

The freedom to hike the park's designated 3–7 km trails is a big draw for tourists. The CAMPFIRE campsite is maintained by the local community.

Geography of Zimbabwe
Geography of Mashonaland Central Province